Brachychaeteumatidae is a family of millipedes belonging to the order Chordeumatida. Adult millipedes in this family have 30 segments (counting the collum as the first segment and the telson as the last).

Genera:
 Brachychaeteuma Verhoeff, 1911
 Hungarosoma Verhoeff, 1928A
 Iacksoneuma
 Verhoeffeuma Strasser, 1937

References

Chordeumatida
Millipede families